| tries = {{#expr:
 + 6 + 9 + 10
 + 3 + 0 + 5

}}
| top point scorer =
| top try scorer =
| Player of the tournament = 
| website = 
| previous year = 2021
| previous tournament = 2021 Six Nations Under 20s Championship
| next year = 2023
| next tournament = 2023 Six Nations Under 20s Championship
}}
The 2022 Six Nations Under 20s Championship is the 15th Six Nations Under 20s Championship, the annual northern hemisphere rugby union championship contested by the under-20 national teams of England, France, Ireland, Italy, Scotland and Wales. England were the defending champions, having completed a Grand Slam in the previous tournament. Ireland won the tournament for the fourth time and due to winning all five of their matches, a third Grand Slam.

Participants

Table

Table ranking rules
 Four match points are awarded for a win.
 Two match points are awarded for a draw.
 A bonus match point is awarded to a team that scores four or more tries in a match or loses a match by seven points or fewer. If a team scores four tries in a match and loses by seven points or fewer, they are awarded both bonus points.
 Three bonus match points are awarded to a team that wins all five of their matches (known as a Grand Slam). This ensures that a Grand Slam winning team reaches a minimum of 23 points, and thus always ranks over a team who won four matches in which they also were awarded four try bonus points and were also awarded two bonus points (a try bonus and a losing bonus) in the match that they lost for a total of 22 points.
 Tie-breakers
 If two or more teams are tied on match points, the team with the better points difference (points scored less points conceded) is ranked higher.
 If the above tie-breaker fails to separate tied teams, the team that scored the higher number of total tries in their matches is ranked higher.
 If two or more teams remain tied for first place at the end of the championship after applying the above tiebreakers, the title is shared between them.

Fixtures

Week 1

Week 2

Week 3

Week 4

Week 5

References

External links
 Under-20 Six Nations

2022
2022 rugby union tournaments for national teams
2021–22 in English rugby union
2021–22 in French rugby union
2021–22 in Irish rugby union
2021–22 in Italian rugby union
2021–22 in Scottish rugby union
2021–22 in Welsh rugby union
Under 20
February 2022 sports events in the United Kingdom
March 2022 sports events in the United Kingdom